The following sortable table comprises the 200 most topographically prominent mountain peaks of the United States of America.

The summit of a mountain or hill may be measured in three principal ways:
The topographic elevation of a summit measures the height of the summit above a geodetic sea level.
The topographic prominence of a summit is a measure of how high the summit rises above its surroundings.
The topographic isolation (or radius of dominance) of a summit measures how far the summit lies from its nearest point of equal elevation.



Most prominent summits

Of these 200 most prominent summits of the United States, 84 are located in Alaska, 17 in California, 17 in Nevada, 14 in Washington, 12 in Montana, 11 in Utah, nine in Arizona, seven in Hawaii, six in Colorado, six in Oregon, four in Wyoming, four in Idaho, four in New Mexico, two in North Carolina, and one each in New Hampshire, New York, Tennessee, Texas and Maine. Four of these peaks lie on the international border between Alaska and British Columbia, four lie on the international border between Alaska and Yukon, and one lies on the state border between Tennessee and North Carolina.

Gallery

See also

List of mountain peaks of North America
List of mountain peaks of Greenland
List of mountain peaks of Canada
List of mountain peaks of the Rocky Mountains
List of mountain peaks of the United States
List of the highest major summits of the United States
List of United States fourteeners

List of the most isolated major summits of the United States
List of mountain peaks of Alaska
List of mountain peaks of California
List of mountain peaks of Colorado
List of mountain peaks of Hawaii
List of mountain peaks of México
List of mountain peaks of Central America
List of mountain peaks of the Caribbean
United States of America
Geography of the United States
Geology of the United States
:Category:Mountains of the United States
commons:Category:Mountains of the United States
Physical geography
Topography
Topographic elevation
Topographic prominence
Topographic isolation

Notes

References

External links

United States Geological Survey (USGS)
Geographic Names Information System @ USGS
United States National Geodetic Survey (NGS)
Geodetic Glossary @ NGS
NGVD 29 to NAVD 88 online elevation converter @ NGS
Survey Marks and Datasheets @ NGS
Bivouac.com
Peakbagger.com
Peaklist.org
Peakware.com
Summitpost.org

 
Prominent
United States, List Of The Most Prominent Summits Of The